Marcus Rowland may refer to:

Marcus Rowland (author) (born 1953), British author
Marcus Rowland (athlete) (born 1990), American athlete